Abram Trigg (1750 – unknown) was an American farmer and politician from Bedford County, Virginia. He fought with the Virginia militia in the Revolutionary War and represented Virginia in the U.S. Congress from 1797 until 1809. He was a slaveholder.

Family life
Abram was born on his father's farm near New London in Lunenburg County, Virginia. He was one of the eight children of  William Trigg (1716–1773) and Mary (Johns) Trigg (1720–1773). His father, William served as a judge in Bedford County (which was formed from part of Lunenburg County in 1754) for many years. His brother, John, would serve with him in congress. In 1779 Abram married Susannah Ingles, daughter of William Ingles and Mary Draper Ingles, who escaped from Indian captivity and walked 800 miles to return to her home in 1755.

Career
He completed academic studies, studied law and was admitted to the bar and commenced practice in Montgomery County, Virginia. He lived on his estate, "Buchanan's Bottom," on the New River and held local offices, such as clerk and judge, and various other offices in Montgomery County. Abram married Susanna Ingles, daughter of William Ingles, and had ten children. He served in the Revolutionary War as lieutenant colonel of militia in 1782 and later as general of militia in Virginia.

Trigg was a delegate to the Virginia ratification convention of 1788, and voted with Patrick Henry and the Anti-federalists against ratification of the United States Constitution. He was elected as a Republican to the Fifth and to the five succeeding Congresses (March 4, 1797 – March 3, 1809). He died and was buried on the family estate, death date unknown.

Electoral history
1797; Trigg was elected to the U.S. House of Representatives unopposed.
1799; Trigg was re-elected with 88.47% of the vote, defeating Federalist William Preston.
1801; Trigg was re-elected unopposed.
1803; Trigg was re-elected unopposed.
1805; Trigg was re-elected unopposed.
1807; Trigg was re-elected defeating Federalist Daniel Sheffey.

References
 Retrieved on 2009-02-26

1750 births
Year of death unknown
People from Bedford, Virginia
Virginia militiamen in the American Revolution
Virginia lawyers
Democratic-Republican Party members of the United States House of Representatives from Virginia